The Big Man is a novel by William McIlvanney published in 1986 based on real life miner and bare knuckle boxer Thomas Tallen. The book was adapted into a film directed by David Leland, The Big Man (1990), which stars Liam Neeson, Billy Connolly, and Hugh Grant.

Plot
This novel relates the story of Dan Scoular, an unemployed man who turns to bare-knuckle boxing to make a living.

References

1985 British novels
Novels about boxing
Scottish novels
Novels by William McIlvanney
Hodder & Stoughton books